The N E Manion Cup is an Australian Turf Club Group 3 Thoroughbred quality handicap horse race for three year olds and upwards over a distance of 2400 metres, held annually at Rosehill Racecourse in Sydney, Australia in March. Total prizemoney for the race is A$200,000.

History
The race is named in honour of N. E. Manion, former director of the Sydney Turf Club.

Grade
 1973–1978 - Principal Race
 1979–2005 - Group 3
 2006–2013 - Listed Race
 2014 onwards - Group 3

Distance
 1973–1978 - 2000 metres
 1979 onwards - 2400 metres

Winners

 2023 - Timour
 2022 - No Compromise  
 2021 - Favorite Moon
 2020 - Young Rascal
 2019 - Midterm
 2018 - Master Of Arts
 2017 - Big Duke
 2016 - Libran
 2015 - Permit
2014 - The Offer
2013 - Julienas
2012 - Permit
2011 - Bid Spotter
2010 - Precedence
2009 - Enzedex Eagle
2008 - The Chieftain
2007 - The Chieftain
2006 - Fooram
2005 - Mahtoum
2004 - Saturday Fever
2003 - Grand City
2002 - Manner Hill
2001 - Tiger's Eye
2000 - Pravda
1999 - Our Unicorn
1998 - Praise Indeed
1997 - Palos Verdes
1996 - Tennessee Oak
1995 - Super Monarch
1994 - Air Seattle
1993 - Azzaam
1992 - Dr Grace
1991 - Dr Grace
1990 - Lord Hybrow
1989 - Concordance
1988 - Our Palliser
1987 - Indian Raj
1986 - Marooned
1985 - Astrolin
1984 - Hawaiian Rain
1983 - Kaidahom
1982 - Sean's Pride 
1981 - Shamrock King 
1980 - Shahman 
1979 - Mr. Bluebeard 
1978 - Cold Steel 
1977 - Rhalif 
1976 - Paris Court 
1975 - Sovereign Yacht 
1974 - Gala Supreme 
1973 - Odyssey

See also
 List of Australian Group races
 Group races

External links 
First three placegetters N.E. Manion Cup

References

Horse races in Australia